Maurette Brown Clark (born 1966; as Maurette Brown), is an American gospel musician. She started her solo music career in 1998 with the release of How I Feel on Verity Records. Her subsequent three album were released by Atlanta International Records, with 2002's By His Grace, 2007's The Dream and 2011's The Sound of Victory. They all charted on the Billboard Gospel Albums chart. Clark has also been a member of Richard Smallwood's group, Vision, since its inception in 1996

Early life
Clark was born in Long Island, New York to musically inclined parents. She started singing at four years of age and began singing lessons at six. She sang during her high school and collegiate days before touring with other gospel musicians.

Music career
Clark's solo music career began in 1998 with the release of How I Feel on August 25 by Verity Records, which peaked on the Billboard Gospel Albums chart at #8. Her next releases were with Atlanta International Records. She By His Grace (released August 6, 2002) reached #12 on the Gospel Albums chart. The Dream (released March 6, 2007) reached #34. The fourth album, The Sound of Victory (released November 1, 2011) reached #6. Cross Rhythms' rated her first release a six out of ten; and second, nine out of ten.

Discography

References

External links
 Official website

1966 births
Living people
African-American songwriters
African-American Christians
Musicians from New York (state)
Songwriters from New York (state)
21st-century African-American people
20th-century African-American people